Clendenin is a surname. Notable people with the surname include:

David Clendenin, American investor, soldier, and politician
David Ramsay Clendenin (1830–1895), American Union Army general
John Clendenin (born 1934), American businessman
Michael Clendenin (1934–2017), American journalist